Al-Furat University is a Syrian university. It is located in Deir ez-Zor and has campuses in other cities in Syria. It is a public university, founded in 2006. It is the fifth largest university in Syria.

References

External links
 Al-Furat University homepage

Furat